Martin Peter Cattalini (born 4 October 1973) is a retired Australian professional basketball player who won championships with both the Perth Wildcats and the Adelaide 36ers in the NBL.

Career
Cattalini began his NBL career for the Wildcats in 1993, where he competed in his first NBL grand final that year but lost to the Andrew Gaze and Mark Bradtke led Melbourne Tigers. He won his first NBL championship in 1995 when Perth defeated the defending champion North Melbourne Giants. Struggling to find court-time with the Wildcats behind starting forwards Andrew Vlahov (the team captain and an Australian Boomers mainstay), Scott Fisher and centre James Crawford, Cattalini left the Wildcats to join the Adelaide 36ers in 1996.

Cattalini was instrumental in this Adelaide side, achieving back to back NBL championships in 1998 and 1998–99. Under the coaching of Australian basketball legend Phil Smyth, Cattalini's game blossomed with Adelaide from 1998 and he averaged over 10 points per game (15.8) for the first time in his career. In the 1998 off season he would work on his mid range jumper with former Adelaide sharp shooter Jason 'Mid Strength' Scarff. He would dip slightly to 14.9 in 1998–99. During his championship years with the 36ers, 'Cat' played alongside others such as Brett Maher, Paul Rees, Mark Davis, Scott Ninnis, Rupert Sapwell, David Stiff and former Denver Nuggets NBA players Darnell Mee and Kevin Brooks. In the 1999–2000 season, although Adelaide lost in the Semi-finals to the Victoria Titans, Cattalini achieved a then career high 20.3 points per game.

In 2001, Cattalini left the 36ers to compete in Spain initially for Deportivo Baloncesto Sevilla and then Caja San Fernando Sevilla in 2002.  Cattalini returned to the 36ers in 2003 for two more seasons, before once again heading to Spain to play for DKV Joventut in 2004/2005.

Cattalini returned to Australia in 2006 and was rumoured to be in talks with multiple NBL clubs, including his two former teams, before signing with the Cairns Taipans.  The 2007 season saw Cattalini average a career high 24.4 points per game and he was instrumental in numerous victories for the Taipans.

In June 2009, it was announced that Cattalini would return to Perth, and again play for the Perth Wildcats.

After a stellar NBL career in which he won 4 championships, Cattalini retired after playing in the Wildcats 2009–10 NBL championship having played 453 NBL games.

International career
After averaging a then career high 20.3 points for the 36ers in the 1999–2000 NBL season, Cattalini made his Olympic Games debut for the Australian Boomers at the 2000 Olympics in Sydney, helping the team to 4th place. He was also part of the Boomers squad for the 2004 Olympic Games in Athens, though the team fell to 9th place.

Personal life
Martin Cattalini is married to Trina and has two children, Zoe and Noah.

Honour roll

NBL career stats

References

External links
Profile at Eurobasket.com
Spanish League profile

1973 births
Living people
Adelaide 36ers players
Australian men's basketball players
Australian expatriate basketball people in Spain
Australian people of Italian descent
Basketball players at the 2000 Summer Olympics
Basketball players at the 2004 Summer Olympics
Cairns Taipans players
Real Betis Baloncesto players
Joventut Badalona players
Liga ACB players
Olympic basketball players of Australia
Sportspeople from Fremantle
Perth Wildcats players
Forwards (basketball)